Michael Dimattina (born 11 May 1965) is an Australian former cricketer. He played 69 first-class cricket matches for Victoria between 1984 and 1990.

See also
 List of Victoria first-class cricketers

References

External links
 

1965 births
Living people
Australian cricketers
Victoria cricketers
Cricketers from Melbourne
People educated at Marcellin College, Bulleen